Ancora is the third studio album released by classical crossover vocal group Il Divo. The album was released in the United Kingdom and other parts of Europe on 7 November 2005, excluding the United States and Latin America. The album was later released in the United States and Latin America on 24 January 2006. It debuted at number one on the Billboard 200 on the week of releases. The album contains one song partially in Latin, one song performed in Italian, two songs performed in French, two songs performed in English, and six songs performed in Spanish, excluding the bonus track. The album features the single "I Believe in You", performed with Céline Dion, that is also featured on her international album, On Ne Change Pas.

This was recorded in both Sweden and London with producers Per Magnusson, David Kreuger and Steve Mac, who were also the producers of their first album. Released on 7 November 2005 in the UK, it hit number one both in the UK and Australia within one week. Ancora was released in the US on 24 January 2006. It entered the Billboard albums chart at number 1, selling more than 150,000 copies during its first week of sales.

Highlights include "Isabel", "I Believe in You (Je crois en toi)", a duet with Céline Dion, a Spanish version of Secret Garden's "You Raise Me Up" (Por ti seré), and a Spanish cover of Eric Carmen's "All by Myself". Two of the tracks on the non-American release of this CD, "O Holy Night" and a version of Schubert's "Ave Maria", also appear on 2005's The Christmas Collection.

Track listing

Charts

Weekly charts

Year-end charts

Decade-end chart

Certifications

References

2005 albums
Columbia Records albums
Il Divo albums
Syco Music albums